Mulsantina luteodorsa, the clay-colored lady beetle, is a species of lady beetle in the family Coccinellidae. It is endemic to southeastern United States. It measures  in length.

References

Further reading

 

Coccinellidae
Beetles of the United States
Endemic fauna of the United States
Beetles described in 1973
Articles created by Qbugbot